Santo Tomás Mazaltepec  is a town and municipality in Oaxaca in south-western Mexico. The municipality covers an area of  km². 
It is part of the Etla District in the Valles Centrales region.
As of 2005, the municipality had a total population of 1,878, of whom 926 spoke an indigenous language (Zapotec).

References

Municipalities of Oaxaca